Neoclassical liberalism, also referred to as Arizona School liberalism and bleeding-heart libertarianism, is a libertarian political philosophy that focuses on the compatibility of support for civil liberties and free markets on the one hand and a concern for social justice and the well-being of the worst-off on the other. Adherents of neoclassical liberalism broadly hold that an agenda focused upon individual liberty will be of most benefit to the economically weak and socially disadvantaged.

History 
The first known use of the term "Arizona School" was by Andrew Sabl, introducing David Schmidtz at a UCLA Department Colloquium in 2012. Upon being pressed to define "Arizona School" Sabl said the school is broadly libertarian but that its most distinguishing characteristic is that it produces  political philosophy that aims to be observation-based and empirically accountable.
The first recorded use of the term bleeding-heart libertarian seems to have been in a 1996 essay by Roderick T. Long. It was subsequently used in a blog post by Stefan Sharkansky and later picked up and elaborated on by Arnold Kling in an article for TCS Daily. Since then, the term has been used sporadically by a number of libertarian writers including Anthony Gregory and Bryan Caplan.

In March 2011, a group of academic philosophers, political theorists and economists created the Bleeding Heart Libertarians blog. Regular contributors to the blog included Fernando Tesón, Gary Chartier, Jason Brennan, Matt Zwolinski, Roderick T. Long, and Steven Horwitz.

Criticism 
Critics of the bleeding-heart libertarian movement include economist David D. Friedman, for whom bleeding-heart libertarians "insist that social justice ought to be part of libertarianism but are unwilling to tell us what it means."

See also 

 Classical liberalism
 Gary Chartier
 Compassionate conservatism
 Distributive justice
 Fred Foldvary
 Free Market Fairness
 Geolibertarianism
 Left-wing market anarchism
 Left-libertarianism
 Libertarian paternalism
 Lockean proviso
 Michael Munger
 Neo-libertarianism
 Michael Otsuka
 Poverty reduction
 Radical centrism
 Radicalism (historical)
 David Schmidtz
 Hillel Steiner

Notes

References 
 Jeffrey Edward Green (2016), The Shadow of Unfairness: A Plebeian Theory of Liberal Democracy, Oxford University Press.
 Jason Brennan, Bas van der Vossen, David Schmidtz, eds. (2017), The Routledge Handbook of Libertarianism, Routledge: "Libertarianism and the Welfare State" by Matt Zwolinski.

Further reading 
 Jeppe von Platz, "Absolute freedom of contract: Grotian Lessons for Libertarians", Critical Review 25(1), 2013, 107–119.
 Rob Reich, "Gift Giving and Philanthropy in Market Democracy", Critical Review 26(3–4), 2014, 408–422.
 Nicolás Maloberti, "Rawls and Bleeding Heart Libertarianism: How Well Do They Mix?", The Independent Review 19(4), 2015, 563–582.
 Otto Lehto, "The Limited Welfare State as Utopia: The Case for a Libertarian Basic Income", Presentation for the BIEN World Congress (Seoul, Korea, 2016).

External links 
 Bleeding Heart Libertarians – The official blog
 Matt Zwolinski discusses Bleeding Heart Libertarianism with Reason TV
 New Libertarians: New Promoters of a Welfare State – A historical look at the development of (and ultimately a criticism of) Bleeding Heart Libertarianism by John P. McCaskey
 Instituto Mercado Popular – BHL Brazilian research institute (in Portuguese)

Controversies within libertarianism
Liberalism
Libertarianism
Libertarianism by form
Political theories
Social liberalism
Left-libertarianism